RIPE Atlas is a global, open, distributed Internet measurement platform, consisting of thousands of measurement devices that measure Internet connectivity in real time.

History

RIPE Atlas was established in 2010 by the RIPE Network Coordination Centre. As of April 2022, it was composed of around 12,000 probes and more than 800 anchors around the world.

Technical details

 Measurement types: The measurement devices (probes and anchors) perform IPv4 and IPv6 traceroute, ping, DNS, NTP and other measurements.
 Atlas Probe device types:
 Versions 1 and 2 of the probe: Lantronix XPort Pro 
 Version 3 probe: modified TP-Link wireless router (model TL-MR 3020)
 Version 4 probe: NanoPi NEO Plus2 single-board computer
 Version 5 probe: custom design, derived from Turris Mox, developed by CZ.NIC
Atlas Anchor device types
Version 2: Soekris Net6501-70 board in the 1U 19-inch rack-mounted case with additional SSD
Version 3: PC Engines APU2C2/APU2C4 in a 1U 19-inch rack-mounted case with additional SSD
 Probes and Anchors can also be hosted in a virtual machine, which is beneficial for organizations with existing server infrastructure
 The back-end architecture was described in detail in the September 2015 edition of the Internet Protocol Journal

Community

Anyone can volunteer to host a RIPE Atlas probe. Probes are free of charge, low maintenance, and can be plugged in behind a home router or in a data center.

Organisations that want additional RIPE Atlas measurements targeting their network can host a RIPE Atlas anchor.

Tools for visualizing and analyzing RIPE Atlas measurement data are used by network operators for troubleshooting and network monitoring.

Open source software tools, written by RIPE Atlas users, are available in the repository for community contributions on GitHub.

Several hundred individuals also support RIPE Atlas as "ambassadors" by promoting participation and distributing probes. Organizations also support RIPE Atlas as sponsors.

Multiple hackerspaces have installed RIPE Atlas probes and have their own project about displaying the probes presence.

Research papers

All the data collected by RIPE Atlas is open data and is made publicly available to users and the wider Internet community.

 Measuring Internet Resilience in Africa

 Surrounded by the Clouds: A Comprehensive Cloud Reachability Study
 Pruning Edge Research with Latency Shears
 Measuring DNS over TLS from the Edge: Adoption, Reliability, and Response Times
 Processing large-scale Internet topology data to model Autonomous System Networks
 Poster: Footprint and Performance of Large Cloud Networks
 Quantifying the Impact of Blocklisting in the Age of Address Reuse
 Impact of the COVID-19 pandemic on the Internet latency: a large-scale study
 (How Much) Does a Private WAN Improve Cloud Performance?
 Debogonising 2a10::/12. Analysis of one week’s visibility of a new /12
 Tracking Down Sources of Spoofed IP Packets
 On the Performance of DNS Resolvers in the IPv6 and ECS Era
 Roll, Roll, Roll your Root: A Comprehensive Analysis of the First Ever DNSSEC Root KSK Rollover 
 Performance Barriers to Cloud Services in Africa’s Public Sector: A Latency Perspective
 DNS Observatory: The Big Picture of the DNS
 Cache Me If You Can: Effects of DNS Time-to-Live
 Judicious QoS using Cloud Overlays 
 Internet Development in Africa: A Content Use, Hosting and Distribution Perspective
 Periodic Path Changes in RIPE Atlas
 Using RIPE Atlas for Geolocating IP Infrastructure
 Dissecting the Speed-of-Internet of Middle East
 Cross-AS (X-AS) Internet topology mapping
 Karaoke: Distributed Private Messaging Immune to Passive Traffic Analysis
 Radian: Visual Exploration of Traceroutes
 How to Catch when Proxies Lie: Verifying the Physical Locations of Network Proxies with Active Geolocation 
 A Long Way to the Top: Significance, Structure, and Stability of Internet Top Lists 
 An Empirical Analysis of the Commercial VPN Ecosystem 
 Ensuring a Future for Detecting Internet Disruptions: A Field Survey of the Ecosystem Around Internet Censorship, Disruptions, and Shutdowns 
 Characterizing User-to-User Connectivity with RIPE Atlas 
 Measurement Vantage Point Selection Using A Similarity Metric 
 Disco: Fast, Good, and Cheap Outage Detection
 Geolocation hints verification using RIPE Atlas 
 Using RIPE Atlas to Evaluate the Locator/Id Separation Protocol 
 Performance Evaluation of Locator/Identifier Separation Protocol through RIPE Atlas 
 Sibyl: A Practical Internet Route Oracle 
 On the Analysis of Internet Paths with DisNETPerf, a Distributed Paths Performance Analyzer 
 Detecting DNS Root Manipulation 
 Measuring, Characterizing, and Avoiding Spam Traffic Costs
 Internet Performance Measurement Platforms 
 Visualization and Monitoring for the Identification and Analysis of DNS Issues
 Investigating Interdomain Routing Policies 
 Mapping Peering Interconnections 
 Lessons Learned From Using the RIPE Atlas Platform for Measurement Research 
 Quantifying Interference between Measurements on the RIPE Atlas Platform 
 Are We One Hop Away from a Better Internet? 
 Analyzing the Performance of an Anycast CDN 
 Investigating Interdomain Routing Policies in the Wild 
 Dissecting Last-mile Latency Characteristics
 Vantage Point Selection for IPv6 Measurements: Benefits and Limitations of RIPE Atlas Tags
 Network Interference Detection 
 Generating Function For Network Delay

See also
 PlanetLab
 PerfSONAR

References

External links

 RIPE Atlas home page
 RIPE Labs blog articles about RIPE Atlas
 GitHub repository for RIPE Atlas community contributed software

Free network management software
Internet Protocol based network software
Unix network-related software